Raymond Lavigne (born November 16, 1945) is a former Canadian senator and businessman, and a former Member of Parliament (MP).

Career 
Lavigne first ran as a Liberal candidate for the House of Commons of Canada in the Quebec riding of Verdun—Saint-Paul at the 1988 election but was unsuccessful. He successfully contested the riding in the 1993 election. He was re-elected as the MP for the riding, with altered boundaries, in the 1997 and 2000 federal elections. He served until he was appointed to the Canadian Senate on March 26, 2002.

He was appointed to the Senate on the advice of Prime Minister Jean Chrétien to make his riding available for Liza Frulla, a former Quebec cabinet minister.

Criminal charges and convictions
On June 8, 2006, he was expelled from the Liberal caucus after allegedly misusing Senate funds for personal use. He apparently used $23,000 in funds for work on his estate, including having his executive assistant cut down trees on his property.

Since then, Lavigne's lawyer said that Lavigne had agreed to pay back the $23,000, without an admission of wrongdoing.

On August 14, 2007, the Royal Canadian Mounted Police, who had been investigating allegations raised concerning the misuse of funds for the last year, laid criminal charges against Lavigne: fraud over $5,000, breach of trust and obstruction of justice. Because of the criminal proceedings, Lavigne is barred from sitting in the Senate or taking part in any Senate committees, but still drew a salary and was entitled to claim expenses.

His trial on these charges began December 9, 2009. Closing arguments took place on September 17, 2010, having been rescheduled from July 2010 to allow Lavigne to obtain trial transcripts. On November 12, 2010, it was announced by the court that Judge Robert Smith's decision is ready but a date for the decision could not be set because Lavigne's lawyers did not show up. A final ruling was scheduled to be issued on February 22, 2011, but the court instead heard argument on how much weight should be given to Senate report on expenses spending. Lavigne's lawyers argued he should not be found guilty because the rules were unclear. On March 11, 2011, Lavigne was found guilty of fraud and breach of trust, and was acquitted on the third charge of obstruction of justice.

Because of the maximum term of 14 years in prison, Lavigne is not eligible for a discharge. Therefore, he will be suspended from the Senate under Senate Rule 141 from the date of his sentencing until his sentence is overturned on appeal or the Senate decides whether to expel him.  Under Rules 138–139, he will not receive a sessional allowance or various perquisites to which senators are entitled; it is not clear whether his salary will be affected by the suspension.

On March 21, 2011, Lavigne resigned from the Senate.

On May 10, 2011, Lavigne was sentenced to six months in prison with an additional, consecutive six month conditional sentence to be served at home. Lavigne appealed both his convictions and sentences, but his appeals were rejected. He began serving his sentence in June, 2013.

Electoral record

References

External links

1945 births
Living people
Liberal Party of Canada MPs
Members of the House of Commons of Canada from Quebec
Liberal Party of Canada senators
Canadian senators from Quebec
People from Verdun, Quebec
21st-century Canadian politicians